Vizcarra (sometimes spelled as "Viscarra") is a Basque surname which originated in the town of Guernica, Spain.  This surname is mostly found in the Basque Country, Mexico, Peru, Bolivia and the Philippines. People with this surname include:
 Joan Vizcarra, Spanish cartoonist
 José Vizcarra, soccer player for the Canalla team in Argentina
 José Antonio Vizcarra, Governor of New Mexico from 1822 to 1823
 Manuel Vizcarra, founder of the city of Mexicali, Baja California, Mexico
 Martín Vizcarra, President of Perú from 2018 to 2020

Other uses
 Vizcarra, a fictional planet in the Star Wars franchise

Basque-language surnames